"The Love that Faded" is a song by Bob Dylan.  It contains lyrics by Hank Williams to which Dylan composed music and appears on the 2011 LP The Lost Notebooks of Hank Williams.

Background
In 2006, a janitor working for Sony/ATV Music Publishing claimed to have found Williams' unfinished lyrics inside a Sony-owned dumpster.   The unfinished lyrics were later returned to Sony/ATV, which handed them to Bob Dylan in 2008 to complete the songs for an album release. Dylan completed one song; others were completed by other artists.  Dylan's admiration for Williams' work is well documented.  When asked about his all-time favorite singer-songwriters in interviews, Williams is nearly always mentioned, and in his autobiography Chronicles: Volume One, Dylan states, "When I hear Hank sing, all movement ceases.  The slightest whisper seems sacrilege."  

Dylan had recorded and performed several Williams songs before "The Love that Faded":  

He cut "(I Heard That) Lonesome Whistle" during The Freewheelin' Bob Dylan sessions (which appears on the 2012 set The 50th Anniversary Collection)
 In the 1967 film Don't Look Back he sings "I'm So Lonesome I Could Cry" and "Lost Highway" in a hotel room with Joan Baez looking on.
During his retreat in Woodstock in 1967 with the Band he recorded "My Bucket's Got a Hole in It," "You Win Again," and "Be Careful of Stones That You Throw," all of which appear on The Bootleg Series Vol. 11: The Basement Tapes Complete.
"Kaw-Liga" is featured during a New York studio session in the film Renaldo and Clara.
He cut a version of "I Can't Get You Off of My Mind" for the 2001 LP Timeless:  Hank Williams Tribute.
Dylan has performed "You Win Again" with Willie Nelson onstage several times.
In the 2005 documentary No Direction Home he appears in archival footage sitting at a piano with a thoroughly wasted Johnny Cash singing "I'm So Lonesome I Could Cry."

Discography

2011 songs
Bob Dylan songs
Songs written by Bob Dylan
Songs written by Hank Williams